Centromadia parryi, the pappose tarweed, is a species of plant in the tribe Madieae within the family Asteraceae. It is found in North America where it is native to California and, northern Baja California.

Centromadia parryi is an herb up to 70 cm (28 inches) tall. It produces arrays of numerous yellow flower heads with both ray florets and disc florets.

Subspecies
 Centromadia parryi subsp. australis (D.D.Keck) B.G.Baldwin - from Santa Barbara Co to Baja California
 Centromadia parryi subsp. congdonii (B.L.Rob. & Greenm.) B.G.Baldwin  - from Solano Co to San Luis Obispo Co
 Centromadia parryi subsp. parryi  - from Glenn Co to Santa Clara Co
 Centromadia parryi subsp. rudis (Greene) B.G.Baldwin - from Butte Co + Mendocino Co to Merced Co; also Modoc Co

References

External links
photo of herbarium specimen at Missouri Botanical Garden, collected near Calistoga, California, isotype of Centromadia parryi/Hemizonia parryi

Flora of California
Flora of Baja California
Plants described in 1882
Madieae
Flora without expected TNC conservation status